In mathematics, trigonometric integrals are a family of integrals involving trigonometric functions.

Sine integral

The different sine integral definitions are

Note that the integrand  is the sinc function, and also the zeroth spherical Bessel function.
Since  is an even entire function (holomorphic over the entire complex plane),  is entire, odd, and the integral in its definition can be taken along any path connecting the endpoints.

Their difference  is given by the Dirichlet integral,

In signal processing, the oscillations of the sine integral cause overshoot and ringing artifacts when using the sinc filter, and frequency domain ringing if using a truncated sinc filter as a low-pass filter.

Related is the Gibbs phenomenon: If the sine integral is considered as the convolution of the sinc function with the heaviside step function, this corresponds to truncating the Fourier series, which is the cause of the Gibbs phenomenon.

Cosine integral

The different cosine integral definitions are

where  is the Euler–Mascheroni constant.

The two definitions are related by

 is an even, entire function.

Hyperbolic sine integral
The hyperbolic sine integral is defined as

It is related to the ordinary sine integral by

Hyperbolic cosine integral
The hyperbolic cosine integral is

where  is the Euler–Mascheroni constant.

It has the series expansion

Auxiliary functions
Trigonometric integrals can be understood in terms of the so-called "auxiliary functions"

Using these functions, the trigonometric integrals may be re-expressed as 
(cf. Abramowitz & Stegun, p. 232)

Nielsen's spiral

The spiral is closely related to the Fresnel integrals and the Euler spiral. Nielsen's spiral has applications in vision processing, road and track construction and other areas.

Expansion
Various expansions can be used for evaluation of trigonometric integrals, depending on the range of the argument.

Asymptotic series (for large argument)

Convergent series

Derivation of series expansion 
From the Maclaurin series expansion of sine:

Relation with the exponential integral of imaginary argument
The function

is called the exponential integral.

As each respective function is analytic except for the cut at negative values of the argument, the area of validity of the relation should be extended to (Outside this range, additional terms which are integer factors of  appear in the expression.)

Cases of imaginary argument of the generalized integro-exponential function are

which is the real part of

Similarly

Efficient evaluation
Padé approximants of the convergent Taylor series provide an efficient way to evaluate the functions for small arguments. The following formulae, given by Rowe et al.

See also
Logarithmic integral
Tanc function
Tanhc function
Sinhc function
Coshc function

References

Further reading

External links
 http://mathworld.wolfram.com/SineIntegral.html
 
 

Trigonometry
Special functions
Special hypergeometric functions
Integrals